Ion is a Greek chocolate brand.

History 
Although the first chocolate recipe has been manufactured since 1927, the company was formally incorporated in 1930. The main factory is located in Neo Faliro Pireaus.

Corporate affairs 
The company has grown to be one of Greece’s 50 largest companies with annual sales of over €100 million. In 1988, Kraft Jacobs Sushard (KJS) acquired 24.5% of holdings, which were bought back by the main shareholders in 1998.

Products 
Over the years, Ion introduced other chocolate varieties confectionery products such as croissants and spreadable chocolate. However, it is best known for its almond milk chocolate variety.

See also 

 List of bean-to-bar chocolate manufacturers

References

Greek chocolate companies
Manufacturing companies based in Athens
Greek brands
Brand name chocolate
Food and drink companies established in 1927
Greek companies established in 1927